The 2013 The Citadel Bulldogs football team represented The Citadel, The Military College of South Carolina in the 2013 NCAA Division I FCS football season. The Bulldogs were led by ninth year head coach Kevin Higgins and played their home games at Johnson Hagood Stadium. They played as members of the Southern Conference, as they have since 1936. They finished the season 5–7, 4–4 in SoCon play to finish in a four way tie for fourth place.

At the end of the season, head coach Kevin Higgins resigned to become an assistant coach at Wake Forest.

Schedule
For the third year in a row, home games in September were scheduled for a 6:00 p.m. kickoff rather than the traditional 2:00 p.m. kickoff.  The Bulldogs faced in-state FBS rival Clemson and Old Dominion, in its first year of transitioning to FBS.  FCS teams were permitted to play twelve games in 2013 due to an extra Saturday falling between Labor Day and Thanksgiving.

Game summaries

Charleston Southern

Wofford

Western Carolina

Old Dominion

Furman

Appalachian State

Georgia Southern

Chattanooga

Samford

Elon

VMI

Clemson

References

Citadel
The Citadel Bulldogs football seasons
Citadel football